A gladius (Latin, 'sword') is the primary sword of Ancient Roman foot soldiers.

Gladius may also refer to:

 Gladius (cephalopod), a hard internal bodypart found in certain cephalopods
 Gladius (video game), a tactical role-playing video game
 Suzuki SFV650 Gladius, a motorcycle
 Gladius, a fictional character in One Piece
 Gladius LLC, a film production company founded by Heri Martínez de Dios
 Warhammer 40,000: Gladius – Relics of War, a 2018 strategy video game

See also

 Gladiolus (disambiguation)
 Gladiator (disambiguation)
 Gladiatrix (disambiguation)
 Gradius, a series of video games